Truth or Dare (released in the United States as Truth or Die) is a 2012 British psychological horror film directed by Robert Heath and written by Matthew McGuchan. The film stars David Oakes, Tom Kane, Jennie Jacques, Liam Boyle, Jack Gordon, Florence Hall and Alexander Vlahos. It made 2.5 million at the box office  against its budget of 1 million.

Plot

The film opens at an end-of-term Halloween house party, where a quiet guy named Felix (Tom Kane) enters, alone. A group of friends is there too, including Chris (Jack Gordon), a spoilt brat, with his mild-mannered girlfriend, Gemma (Florence Hall), his friend Paul (Liam Boyle), with his girlfriend, the abrasive Eleanor (Jennie Jacques), and his drug-dealer friend, Luke (Alexander Vlahos).

Felix appears fond of Gemma and watches her from a distance for most of the party, catching Luke's attention. Luke provides Felix with cocaine, and convinces him to go and talk to her (although knowing of the upcoming consequences). Felix asks her out but she politely turns him down.
Meanwhile, Paul and Eleanor attempt to have sex in an upstairs room, but Paul passes out drunk. Dejected, Eleanor decides instead to play truth or dare with the other party guests, downstairs.

The bottle is spun and lands on Felix, who chooses truth, and Eleanor asks him to pick anyone he would like to fulfill his fantasy with. Begrudgingly, he chooses Gemma, who appears somewhat embarrassed. Chris grows jealous and taunts Felix, before punching him. Gemma dumps Chris and runs to console Felix.

Months later, after the Christmas holidays, all five friends get an invitation to Felix's surprise birthday party. 
It is revealed that Felix comes from a very wealthy family, and this is realised when they arrive at his home; a beautiful, but seemingly abandoned mansion. 
After trying to find a way into the building, they are interrupted by the groundsman, Woodbridge (David Sterne), who tells them the correct address; a small shack half a mile down the beaten track, in the forest behind the mansion.
They walk through the woods to the shack, where they are welcomed by a mysterious, handsome man named Justin (David Oakes), who reveals himself to be the elder brother of Felix.

Justin reveals that due to last-minute flight cancellation, Felix will be unable to join them for the party, but welcomes them to stay for drinks anyway. The group start to make themselves comfortable and discover that Justin is a well-trained soldier, having recently returned from three tours of Afghanistan. Justin is also revealed to be particularly homophobic, frequently and casually throwing gay slurs.

Justin suggests they play a game of truth or dare to liven up the party, and before long begins asking them questions regarding the night of the Halloween party, and reveals to everyone that he lied about Felix's absence.
He tells them that Felix actually hung himself from the roof of the shack, the night after the party, with nothing but a postcard in his pocket marked "Truth or Dare, bitch!" (something Chris had said to him previously). Justin threatens that no one can leave until he knows who wrote the postcard, that he believes drove his brother to suicide.
He goes on to explain how Felix's suicide has brought great shame to his family (being both highly religious and respected), and the only way to reconcile this shame is to bring justice to those deemed responsible.

When the group tries to leave, Justin shoots Chris in the leg, and convinces Luke to act as his partner throughout the night, and tie up everyone else.

Justin insists on continuing their game of truth or dare by incorporating a torture method he calls 'The Acid Test', whereby Gemma is force-fed a tube attached to two jars of identical clear liquid; one is said to be filled with tap water, and the other battery acid. Justin forces Chris to choose a jar, and fortunately he chooses the one containing water.
Justin later swaps the roles, force-feeding Chris the tube, and forcing Paul to choose a jar. With Justin having swapped the position of the jars, Paul unintentionally chooses the one containing acid, and Chris chokes to death, bleeding heavily from his mouth.

Before Justin can continue, the group is interrupted by an intruder, knocking at the door (who is revealed to be Luke's drug-dealer friend, Jonesy (Jason Maza), who followed them to the party).
After Luke fails to convince Jonesy to leave, Justin intervenes by breaking his arm and threatening to shoot him, before handing the gun to Luke and gives him an ultimatum; given there is a 50-50 chance of firing either a blank or a bullet, he can either risk shooting Jonesy, killing him, or shooting Justin, and being able to leave with his surviving friends. Justin assures Luke should he shoot a blank at Jonesy, he can go free, but should he shoot a blank at him, he will kill him instead. Reluctantly, Luke shoots at Jonesy, killing him.
Meanwhile, Gemma loosens her binds and escapes through the back window.

Upon returning to the shack and finding Gemma missing, Justin leaves to find her, while Luke remains to keep watch on Paul and Eleanor.

Gemma reaches the mansion, and searches for help, but is terrified to find Felix, alive but bed-ridden and almost completely paralysed.
Woodbridge arrives and, aiming a shotgun at Gemma, reveals that it was he who found Felix hanging in the shack and has been caring for him ever since - he and Gemma get into a scuffle, and in an attempt to wrestle his gun away from her, he is fatally wounded.
Justin arrives at the house, and breaks Gemma's neck in front of Felix, before taunting his brother with her corpse.

Meanwhile, back at the shack, Luke is reluctant to free Paul and Eleanor, claiming that as he has gained Justin's trust and is also responsible for killing Jonesy, he hopes Justin will use his connections to keep him from punishment. He also reveals that it was him who sent the postcard.
However, after convincing him to help her snort cocaine while she is tied up, Eleanor bites off Luke's little finger, sending him flying backwards and impaling himself in the back of the head on a tool lying on the floor, killing him.
Freeing themselves, Paul and Eleanor attempt to escape, but with Paul's leg wound bleeding out they do not get far, before Justin returns with Felix, in a wheelchair.
The three break out into a brawl, wherein Eleanor manages to both shoot Justin in the shoulder, and severely scald him by smashing the jar of battery acid over his head.

Justin later awakens tied to a post by Eleanor, as Paul attempts to start Justin's car outside for them to make their escape. 
Eleanor reveals that it was never really the postcard that drove Felix to suicide, but in fact, a video she had blackmailed him with in exchange for money to help save her father's failing business. 
She explains that after Felix was humiliated in the game of truth or dare, she seduced and convinced him to perform oral sex on the unconscious Paul, upstairs - the fear of his brother discovering his questionable sexuality was what led Felix to attempted suicide.
She then gives Felix a grenade and escapes with Paul, while the house blows up, killing both the brothers.

Cast
 David Oakes as Justin
 Tom Kane as Felix
 Liam Boyle as Paul
 Jack Gordon as Chris
 Florence Hall as Gemma
 Jennie Jacques as Eleanor
 Alexander Vlahos as Luke
 Jason Maza as Jonesy
 David Sterne as Woodbridge

Release
The distribution rights were sold at the American Film Market on 3 November 2011.

Home media
Truth or Dare was released straight-to-video on 27 August 2012 in the United Kingdom and 9 October in the United States.

Reception
Dave Aldridge of Radio Times stated in his movie review: "Truth or Dare is slickly made and decently acted. It has its bloody horror film moments, but director Robert Heath wisely puts equal emphasis on the psychology of its hostage situation".

References

External links
 
 

2012 films
2012 horror thriller films
2012 independent films
2012 psychological thriller films
2010s English-language films
2010s psychological horror films
2010s teen horror films
British horror thriller films
British films about revenge
British independent films
British psychological horror films
British psychological thriller films
British teen horror films
Films about suicide
Halloween horror films
Teen thriller films
2010s British films